Amphisbaena tragorrhectes is a species of worm lizard found in Brazil.

References

tragorrhectes
Reptiles described in 1971
Endemic fauna of Brazil
Reptiles of Brazil
Taxa named by Paulo Vanzolini